Delias anjae is a butterfly in the family Pieridae. It was described by Schroder in 1977. It is found in Arfak Mountains of Irian Jaya.

The wingspan is about 50 mm. Adults are similar to Delias sagessa.

References

External links
Delias at Markku Savela's Lepidoptera and Some Other Life Forms

anjae
Butterflies described in 1977